The Return of the Prodigal Son is an album by jazz saxophonist Stanley Turrentine consisting of two sessions recorded for the Blue Note label in 1967 and arranged by Duke Pearson featuring McCoy Tyner.

Tracks 1, 4, 6 were originally issued on New Time Shuffle (1979, LT 993), along with tracks 1 and 3-5 from A Bluish Bag. Tracks 2-3 and 5 had previously been issued on the collection Stanley Turrentine (1975, BN-LA 394-2), whilst track 9 was released in 1995 on The Lost Grooves.

Reception

The Allmusic review by Michael G. Nastos awarded the album 3½ stars and states "While hitting up a handful of the pop tunes of the day, Turrentine shows he is interested in and capable of tackling more modern compositions... this represents a prelude to the success that would deservedly come his way".

Track listing
 "Return of the Prodigal Son" (Harold Ousley) - 6:36
 "Pres Delight" [aka "Flying Jumbo"] (Turrentine) - 7:06
 "Bonita" (Gene Lees, Ray Gilbert, Antonio Carlos Jobim) - 6:10
 "New Time Shuffle" (Joe Sample) - 5:55
 "Better Luck Next Time" (Irving Berlin) - 5:18
 "Ain't No Mountain High Enough" (Nickolas Ashford, Valerie Simpson) - 4:36
 "Dr. Feelgood" (Aretha Franklin, Ted White) - 5:41
 "The Look of Love" (Burt Bacharach, Hal David) - 6:02
 "You Want Me to Stop Loving You" (Wild Bill Davis) - 5:28
 "Dr. Feelgood" [Alternate Take] - 5:58

Personnel
Stanley Turrentine - tenor saxophone
McCoy Tyner - piano
Duke Pearson - organ, arranger
Garnett Brown - trombone
Joe Shepley, Marvin Stamm - trumpet, flugelhorn (tracks 1-6)
Blue Mitchell - trumpet (tracks 7-10)
Julian Priester - trombone (tracks 1-6)
Al Gibbons - alto saxophone, flute, bass clarinet (tracks 1-6)
James Spaulding - alto saxophone, flute (tracks 7-10)
Joe Farrell - tenor saxophone, flute (tracks 1-6)
Mario Rivera - baritone saxophone (tracks 1-6)
Bob Cranshaw - bass
Ray Lucas - drums
Richard Landrum - congas, bongos, tambourine (tracks 7-10)

Production
 Alfred Lion - producer
 Rudy Van Gelder - engineer

References

2008 albums
Stanley Turrentine albums
Blue Note Records albums
Albums arranged by Duke Pearson
Albums produced by Alfred Lion
Albums recorded at Van Gelder Studio